Bayville is a village in the town of Boothbay Harbor in Lincoln County, Maine, United States.

The village of Bayville was formed in 1911. Bayville consists largely of summer residents and has around 43 houses at the head of Linekin Bay.  The Bayville lineage of several families stretches back some six generations or more. The Bayville website can be found at: www.bayvillemaine.org.

Villages in Lincoln County, Maine
Populated coastal places in Maine